Thomas Francis Maher (July 6, 1870 – August 25, 1929) was a Major League Baseball player who played in  with the Philadelphia Phillies.

Maher played in 2 games, going 0–1.

He was born and died in Philadelphia, Pennsylvania.

External links

1870 births
1929 deaths
Baseball players from Pennsylvania
Philadelphia Phillies players
Norfolk Jewels players
St. Joseph Saints players
Portsmouth Truckers players